Kaohsiung metropolitan area is the urban area of Kaohsiung in southern Taiwan.

Definition
According to the definition of metropolitan areas formerly used by the Republic of China (Taiwan) government, Kaohsiung metropolitan area included the following areas:

However, since the merger of Kaohsiung City and the former Kaohsiung County on 25 December 2010, the term is no longer in official usage.

References 

Geography of Kaohsiung
Metropolitan areas of Taiwan